

J

J